"Fetish" is a song by American singer Selena Gomez featuring guest vocals from American rapper Gucci Mane. It appears as an international bonus track on Gomez's third studio album, Rare (2020). The song was written by Gomez, Gucci Mane, Chloe Angelides, Brett McLaughlin, Gino Barletta, and its producers Jonas Jeberg, Joe Khajadourian, and Alex Schwartz.

"Fetish" received widespread acclaim from music critics, who complimented its experimental nature as well as Gomez's vocals and subsequent artistic growth. The song's music video was directed by Petra Collins and released on July 26, 2017. Commercially, the song reached the top 10 in Canada, the Czech Republic, Finland, Hungary, Malaysia and Slovakia; the top 20 in Lebanon, New Zealand, the Philippines, Portugal and Spain; as well as the top 40 in Australia, Austria, Denmark, France, Germany, Ireland, Norway, Sweden, Switzerland, the United Kingdom, and the United States. It was certified platinum by the RIAA for shifting a million units in the US.

Background and release
Gomez first teased "Fetish" through a short clip which debuted at the end of the music video for her previous single, "Bad Liar". Before the teasing, it was speculated rapper Gucci Mane would appear as the featured artist on a future release, with Mane confirming the collaboration during an interview with 99 Jamz radio station. Gomez followed with several cryptic images tied to the forthcoming song on her Instagram account. The image for the single cover was shot by fashion photographer Petra Collins, who also lensed her artwork for "Bad Liar". It shows Gomez next to a broken-down car carrying paper grocery bags. The single was released to digital music stores on July 13, while an accompanying "playlist video" premiered on Spotify and on her Vevo channel. The audio video features a shot that focuses on her lips while she performs the song. The single was serviced to US contemporary hit radio on July 25.

Composition and lyrical interpretation

"Fetish" is a trap-pop and alternative R&B ballad that contains a beat that blends R&B and electronic music. Its sound has been also described as alt-pop, "hazy" R&B. Lars Brandle from Billboard perceived the presence of auto-tuned effects in its production. Lyrically, the song explores themes of sexuality and sexual desire, in the chorus Gomez discusses the effect attraction has on a lover, while Mane's verse mentions the chemistry between these paramours, with Gomez's breathy vocals pairing around the beats. A writer from Bustle noted that "Gomez admits that while she totally understands why the object of her affection would be a little addicted to her, even when 'I push you out', they come running right back."

Critical reception
"Fetish" received widespread critical acclaim. Mike Wass of Idolator described the song as Gomez's "most scandalous" and "most adventurous" offering yet, stating her transformation into "pop's most experimental princess is all but complete." Wass concluded saying Gomez has "come into her own as an artist, confidently dabbling in sub-genres usually reserved for the alt crowd." XXL writer Peter A. Berry felt the "atmospheric, stripped down" instrumental is "perfect for the bedroom," while Mane's verse "adds an extra layer of dopeness." Time Raisa Bruner called it a "slow-burning, seductive pop song [which] allows Gomez to play with the distinctive textures and rhythms of her voice, developing into a sinuous, alluring track that smartly dispenses with overbearing production, instead focusing in on the star attraction."

Music video

Background and synopsis
The music video was directed by Petra Collins and was released on July 26, 2017. The video opens with three shots of what appears to be Gomez soaking wet with her hair dripping seductively over her face in mirror images then shows Gomez in a pale-yellow dress, carrying bags of groceries similar to the song's cover artwork, on a seemingly normal suburban street, in a role that appears to be a beleaguered housewife, as noted by Stereogum. As the video progresses, Gomez takes part in a range of strange activities. Inside a suburban home, the singer is seen soaking wet (similar to the opening shots earlier) in a dining table with water sprinkling as if it is raining, with candles in the scenery. Then she eats soap, finds a broken glass of wine and proceeds to taste one of the broken fragments, puts lipstick over her teeth, ties a rope around her tongue into a bow, inserting her tongue through an eyelash curler and then writhes around on the kitchen floor, while Gucci Mane raps his verse in a smoky lit underground basement. The clip ends with a shot of Gomez smiling inside an industrial freezer.

Reception
Reviewing the clip, Tatiana Cirisano of Billboard felt it "gives off major Virgin Suicides-meets-Wild at Heart vibes." Entertainment Weeklys Nick Romano noted how the image of Gomez's character is "juxtaposed with her sinister obsessions."

The video's stylist Stella Greenspan drew references from Nobuyoshi Araki's photography books and Isabelle Adjani's performance in the 1981 film Possession to achieve a horror-film inspired aesthetic, within a story of a "good girl gone bad". Greenspan told Vogue:

Track listing
Digital download
 "Fetish" (featuring Gucci Mane) – 3:06

Galantis remix
 "Fetish" (featuring Gucci Mane) [Galantis remix] – 3:27

Credits and personnel
Credits and personnel adapted from Rare album liner notes.

Selena Gomez – lead vocals, songwriting
Gucci Mane – featured vocals, songwriting
Chloe Angelides – background vocals, songwriting
Jonas Jeberg – production, keyboards, bass, drums, songwriting
Joe Khajadourian – keyboards, bass, drums, songwriting
Alex Schwartz – keyboards, bass, drums, songwriting

Brett McLaughlin – songwriting
Gino "Farrago" Barletta – songwriting
Benjamin Rice – vocal engineering, recording
The Futuristics – production
Manny Marroquin – mixing
Chris Gehringer – mastering

Charts

Weekly charts

Year-end charts

Certifications

Release history

References

External links

2017 songs
2017 singles
Selena Gomez songs
Gucci Mane songs
Interscope Records singles
Songs written by Selena Gomez
Songs written by Gucci Mane
Songs written by Chloe Angelides
Torch songs
Songs written by Leland (musician)
Songs written by Jonas Jeberg
Songs written by Joe Khajadourian
Song recordings produced by the Futuristics
Songs written by Alex Schwartz
Pop ballads
2010s ballads
Trap music songs
American contemporary R&B songs
Contemporary R&B ballads
Songs written by Gino Barletta